Azerbaijani family traditions emphasize loyalty, mutual love, honesty, tolerance, and respect for older people and parents. Every person in the family must adhere to the rules and principles that are associated with their personal status and place in the family.

Family Structure 
The Azerbaijani people have a unique family type in the East. In the parent-child relationship, respect for adults is a fundamental value. In most cases, children live with their parents until they marry, and in rare cases, continue to live with their parents after marriage.

Basic familial expectations include prioritizing the family, respecting and caring for family members, and remaining loyal to the regional traditions and rules. The society is developing due to existence of true families.

Until the beginning of the 20th century, big families were very common. In big families, kinship ties are strong and family leadership belong to the married man or elderly man. The eldest son receives the greatest share of the heritage and after the death of his father, he becomes the head of the family.

Before the 20th century, the Azerbaijani family existed in two categories: the first was the broad patriarchal families in which the representatives of two or three generations lived together with their father, mother and married boys; the second one was the small family which consisted of a husband, wife, and children.

It is possible to find examples of large family structure in Azerbaijan in the late 19th century and early 20th century, or even in the early years of the Soviet era. In such families, orphan children would grow up under the influence of their uncle. The real estate was shared within the family according to the Shari'a law and principles. The share of inheritance for male children was more than the inheritance for female children.

Modern family model of Azerbaijan 
Azerbaijani families can be divided into two groups according to the 20th and the beginning of the 21st centuries: families living in districts or villages, suitable for national family mentality; families living in bigger cities such as Baku or in different countries in the world.

Earlier, there were many families with 5-10 members. Moreover, families were staying close to relatives such as an aunt, uncle, grandfather, grandmother, etc. Now, very little of this type of family is left. At the end of the 1980s, only a very small family type began to increase. Now, most of children do not have relatives around such as aunt, uncle, and cousin. 

For example, in the 1990's, an honorary title "mother heroine" was awarded for looking after and raising a large family with 10 children. This action was abolished in 1990s. 

After the gaining independence, mothers with four or five children, were regarded as "mother heroine". But nowadays, Azerbaijan consists of a majority of families with 2 and 3 children.

Woman in Azerbaijani family 
The Azerbaijani women have a special place in protecting the integrity of the family. Everyone is obliged to the mother because of their life and their existence. The word "mother" is holy, that is why native land is called motherland, where humans are born and grow up. Mother is the backbone of the family. The happiness of every family depends on the role of the mother and her activities.

The status of women in Azerbaijan has undergone several major changes over the past few millennia. For instance, women in Azerbaijan provide many solutions to issues related to different periods of the history of country. The Azerbaijan Democratic Republic, created in 1918, provided gender equality rights to people living in the country. Thus, Azerbaijan became the first country in the East to accept a women's right to vote.

A number of events are being held in Azerbaijan on the occasion of International Family Day, which is celebrated worldwide, and aims to direct people's attention to family problems on May 15 each year. The selection of exemplary families at the "Family Holiday", organized by the State Committee for Family, Women and Children Affairs, as well as the holding of ceremonies in different regions of the country, has become a tradition.

At present, there are 1,831,100 families in the country and over the past five years, 766,000 new jobs have been created. Particular attention was paid to the creation of conditions for the comprehensive development of the family and the solution of their various problems.

Marriage age 
The Family Code, allowed marriage age for girls to be raised from 9 to 12 in 2011. According to these new rules, those forcing a woman to marry will be faced with either a fine of 2,000 to 3,000 manats or arrest up to 2 years. If the same situation was committed against someone under age 12, the amount of the fine will be from 3,000 to 4,000 manats and the arrest period up to 4 years.

Laws 
 Azerbaijan joined the International Conventions on the strengthening of family, protection of women and children's rights, and accepted the relevant laws in Republic in the 1990s. In addition, Azerbaijan joined International Labor Organization (ILO) Recommendation #156 on "Equal opportunities and equal treatment for men and women workers - employees with family responsibilities", the UN Convention on the Elimination of All Forms of Discrimination Against Women, “on the rights of the child”, “on the protection of children related to inter-country adoption and cooperation”,  "on Minimum age for Employment of Children in Agriculture", " on prohibition of child labor worst forms and urgent measures to eliminate child labor" and other conventions.

The laws on "Family agriculture", "Children's rights", "Prevention of limitations on disabled children and their health, Rehabilitation and social protection of disabled children", "Social protection of children who lost their parents", "Nutrition of infants and young children", "About compulsory dispensary for children”, The "Transnational organized crime" of UN", Convention on the prevention, suppression and punishment of human trafficking, especially women and children", "on Approval of the protocols against illegal crossing of migrants by land, sea and air ", “about the citizenship of a married woman ", "on regulation of human rights and freedom in the Azerbaijani Republic, " About social services for the elderly", "on the legal status of children born out of wedlock "," On social protection of families with children "and others have been accepted.

The Code of Azerbaijani family 
This Code defines standards governing the establishment and strengthening of family relationships, the principles of breaking relationships, the rights and duties of family members, the responsibilities of public authorities in this field, as well as the rules of state registration of civil status acts, in accordance with the fundamental human and civil rights and freedom envisaged in the Constitution of the Republic of Azerbaijan.

State Committee for Family, Women and Children Affairs of Azerbaijan Republic 

The State Committee for Family, Women and Children Affairs was created by the Decree of the Azerbaijani President on February 6, 2006 and Hijran Huseynova was appointed Chairman of the Committee by the Decree of the President dated February 6, 2006.

The State Committee on Women's Issues was established by the Decree of the President of the Republic of Azerbaijan dated January 14, 1998.

The Committee has been functioning to solve the existing problems in this period. The State Committee for Family, Women and Children Affairs of the Republic of Azerbaijan has been established with the Decree of the Azerbaijani President dated 6 February 2006. The State Committee for Family, Women and Children Affairs of the Azerbaijan is the central executive body that carries out state policy and regulation in the field of work with family, women and children's probs.

The duties of the Committee are consisting of the comprehensive development and consolidation of the family institution, protection of family values, minimizing its problems, increasing the role of the family in society and improving its welfare. During the three years of activity, the committee has achieved a number of successes. In general, no government agency has been dealing with family problems in a centralized way in the country so far. First of all, a general database of families living in Azerbaijan was created, survey questionnaires were conducted in all cities and regions of the republic.

See also 
 Woman in Azerbaijan
 Culture of Azerbaijan

References 

Azerbaijani families
Azerbaijani culture